State Route 106 (SR 106) is a north–south state highway in Middle Tennessee.  The highway is a secret, or hidden, designation for the following highways:
 U.S. Route 31A at Lewisburg
 U.S. Route 431 in Tennessee from Lewisburg to Nashville

State Route 106 begins as a secondary highway until after its concurrency with SR 96 in Frankin, where the rest of the route is a primary highway. 

U.S. Route 431
106
Transportation in Nashville, Tennessee
Transportation in Marshall County, Tennessee
Transportation in Maury County, Tennessee
Transportation in Williamson County, Tennessee
Transportation in Davidson County, Tennessee